KOFY may mean:

 20 KOFY-TV San Francisco, California (FCC facility ID #51189), a television station that formerly used the call signs KBWB, KEMO-TV, and KTZO
 1060 KOFY (AM) Gilmer, Texas (FCC facility ID #34558), a defunct daytime-only AM radio station that was deleted in 2012 and formerly used the call signs KBNB, KHYM, and KTLG until becoming KOFY in 1999
 1050 KTCT San Mateo, California (FCC facility ID #51188), an AM radio station that used the call sign KOFY until 1997